The Jerome First Baptist Church is a church located near Jerome, Idaho that was listed on the National Register of Historic Places in 1983.  It was built in 1931 by master stonemason H.T. Pugh and others.

The Romanesque style church was built in 1931 and added to the Register in 1983.

See also

 List of National Historic Landmarks in Idaho
 National Register of Historic Places listings in Jerome County, Idaho

References

Jerome FirstBaptist
Jerome FirstBaptist
Jerome FirstBaptist
Buildings and structures in Jerome County, Idaho
Jerome FirstBaptist
Jerome FirstBaptist
Jerome FirstBaptist
National Register of Historic Places in Jerome County, Idaho